Pe (П п; italics: П п) is a letter of the Cyrillic script.

History
The Cyrillic letter Pe was derived from the Greek letter Pi (Π π).

In the Cyrillic numeral system, Pe had a value of 80.

Form

The capital Cyrillic letter Pe looks exactly like the Greek capital Pi from which it is derived, and small Pe looks like a smaller version of the same, though with a less prominent horizontal bar (Greek Π π > Cyrillic П п). Pe is not to be confused with the Cyrillic letter El (Л л; italics: Л л), which has a hook on its left leg in some fonts (in others El resembles the Greek Lambda (Λ)).

In italics and handwriting, capital Pe looks identical to the Greek capital Pi in these forms. The lowercase forms, however, differ among the languages that use the Cyrillic alphabet. Small italic Cyrillic Pe  in the majority of fonts or handwritten styles looks like the small italic Latin N . In handwritten Serbian, however, it appears as a Latin U  with a bar over it .

Usage
As used in the alphabets of various languages, Pe represents the following sounds:
palatalized voiceless bilabial plosive 

The pronunciations shown in the table are the primary ones for each language; for details consult the articles on the languages.

Related letters and other similar characters
Π π : Greek letter Pi
Ԥ ԥ : Cyrillic letter Pe with descender
Ҧ ҧ : Cyrillic letter Pe with middle hook
Л л : Cyrillic letter El
N n : Latin letter N
P p : Latin letter P
Р р : Cyrillic letter Er

Computing codes

External links

References